is a city located in Kagawa Prefecture, Japan. , the city had an estimated population of 59,876 in 23024 households and a population density of 270 persons per km².

Geography
Mitoyo is located in western Kagawa Prefecture. It faces the Seto Inland Sea to the north and borders Tokushima Prefecture across the Sanuki Mountains to the south. In the north, the Shonai Peninsula with Mt. Shiude and Mt. Myoken stretches out to the northwest. Some coastal parts of the city are within the borders of the Setonaikai National Park. The city includes Awashima Island and Shishijima in the Seto Inland Sea between Shikoku and Honshu.

Neighbouring municipalities 
Kagawa Prefecture
Zentsuji
Kan'onji
Tadotsu
Kotohira
 Mannō
Tokushima Prefecture
Miyoshi
 Higashimiyoshi

Climate
Mitoyo has a humid subtropical climate (Köppen climate classification Cfa) with hot, humid summers, and cool winters. Some rain falls throughout the year, but the months from May to September have the heaviest rain.

Demographics
Per Japanese census data, the population of Mitoyo in 2020 is 61,857 people. Mitoyo has been conducting censuses since 1920.

History 
The area of Mitoyo was part of the ancient Sanuki Province and has been inhabited since prehistoric times. A number of shell mounds from the Jōmon period have been identified, and the Minami Kusagi Shell Mound is the largest shell mound in Kagawa Prefecture and the Kotsutajima Shell Midden is the oldest in the Seto Inland Sea region. During the Edo Period, the city area was divided between the holdings of Marugame Domain and Tadotsu Domain, and direct tenryō holdings of the Tokugawa shogunate. Following the Meiji restoration, the area was divided into villages within Mino District, which merged with Toyota District to form Mitoyo District, Kagawa in 1899. 

The city of Mitoyo was established on January 1, 2006, from the merger of all seven towns of Mitoyo District: Mino, Nio, Saita, Takase, Takuma, Toyonaka and Yamamoto.

Government
Mitoyo has a mayor-council form of government with a directly elected mayor and a unicameral city council of 22 members. Mitoyo contributes three members to the Kagawa Prefectural Assembly. In terms of national politics, the city is part of Kagawa 3rd district of the lower house of the Diet of Japan.

Economy
The area of Mitoyo was noted for its salt industry in ancient times. In the modern era, efforts have been made to develop harbors and industries in the coastal area, creating a coastal industrial zone centered on Takuma Port. On the other hand, the Shonai Peninsula and offshore islands are focused on flower gardening and tourism. Agriculture remains the largest industry, notably fruits such as grapes, mandarin oranges, and peaches. The city is the largest tea producing area in Kagawa Prefecture. Other crops include lettuce, onions, loquats, and rice. Efforts are being made to integrate agriculture and tourism to promote regional development.

Education
Mitoyo has 19 public elementary schools and six public middle schools operated by the city government, and one private middle school.  The city has two public high schools operated by the Kagawa Prefectural Board of Education and one private high school.

Transportation

Railways 
 Shikoku Railway Company - Yosan Line
 -   -  -  -  - 
 Shikoku Railway Company - Dosan Line

Highways 
  Takamatsu Expressway

Sister city relations
 - Waupaca, Wisconsin, United States, Sister city since 1994.
 - Hapcheon County, South Gyeongsang, South Korea. Friendship city since July 13, 2007 
 - Sanyuan County, Qingdao, Shaanxi , China, friendship city since January 13, 2009

Local attractions
Daikō-ji, 69th temple on the Shikoku Pilgrimage
Motoyama-ji, 70th temple on the Shikoku Pilgrimage; its Man Hall is a National Treasure.
Iyadani-ji, 71st temple on the Shikoku Pilgrimage
Tsushima Shrine, located in on an offshore island, is only accessible during its festival one day a year in early August. 
Shiudeyama Site, National Historic Site

Noted people from Mitoyo
Erika Mabuchi, actress

References

External links 
  
 Nio Dragon Festival in MitoyoNHK(video)

 
Cities in Kagawa Prefecture
Populated coastal places in Japan